Forget Him may refer to:

 "Forget Him" (Bobby Rydell song), 1963
 "Forget Him" (Teresa Teng song), 1980
 Forget Him, a 1993 album by Jacky Cheung
 "Forget Him", a 1993 song by Jacky Cheung